Alexander Alexandrovich Belov, commonly known as Sasha Belov (November 9, 1951 – October 3, 1978), was a Soviet basketball player. During his playing career, he played at the center position. Belov is most remembered for scoring the game-winning basket of the gold medal game of the 1972 Munich Summer Olympic Games, which gave the gold medal to the senior Soviet national team.

Belov was named one of FIBA's 50 Greatest Players in 1991. He was enshrined into the FIBA Hall of Fame in 2007.

Club career
Born in Leningrad, Belov was the star player of Spartak Leningrad (later known as Spartak St. Petersburg), as he led the club to the Soviet Union League title in 1975, and also to three European-wide 2nd-tier level FIBA European Cup Winners' Cup (Saporta Cup) Finals (1971, 1973, and 1975). Including winning the title in both 1973 and 1975. During his club career, Belov was a two-time FIBA European Selection (1971 and 1972).

In 2016, the club that Belov played for was renamed to Kondrashin Belov, for a short time. The club was renamed in honor of both Belov, and the club's former head coach Vladimir Kondrashin.

1975 NBA draft
In the tenth round of the 1975 NBA draft, the New Orleans Jazz selected Belov with the 161st pick of the draft; like the vast majority of Soviet players drafted into North American sports leagues, he would never end up playing for the team that drafted him. It would not be until 1989, that the first Soviet player, Lithuanian-born Šarūnas Marčiulionis, would play in the National Basketball Association (NBA).

National team career
Belov won four gold medals with the senior Soviet Union national team. While representing the USSR, Belov won gold medals at the 1969 EuroBasket, and the bronze medal at the 1970 FIBA World Championship. He also won the gold medal at the 1971 EuroBasket. 

The highlight of Belov's career occurred during the 1972 Summer Olympic Games, when he scored the game-winning basket in the Olympic Basketball Final against Team USA, which gave the Soviet Union the gold medal. After that, he won the gold medal at the 1974 FIBA World Championship, the silver medal at the 1975 EuroBasket, and the bronze medal at the 1976 Summer Olympics.

Life and death
Belov was born in Leningrad, Russian SFSR, Soviet Union, on 9 November 1951. Belov died in Leningrad, on 3 October 1978, at the age of 26. His cause of death was a very rare disease, cardiac sarcoma.

References

External links
 Biography 
 FIBA Hall of Fame page on Belov
 101 Greats: Alexander "Sasha" Belov

1951 births
1978 deaths
Basketball players at the 1972 Summer Olympics
Basketball players at the 1976 Summer Olympics
BC Spartak Saint Petersburg players
Centers (basketball)
Deaths from cancer in the Soviet Union
Deaths from heart cancer
FIBA EuroBasket-winning players
FIBA Hall of Fame inductees
FIBA World Championship-winning players
Medalists at the 1972 Summer Olympics
Medalists at the 1976 Summer Olympics
New Orleans Jazz draft picks
Olympic basketball players of the Soviet Union
Olympic bronze medalists for the Soviet Union
Olympic gold medalists for the Soviet Union
Olympic medalists in basketball
Russian men's basketball players
Soviet men's basketball players
1970 FIBA World Championship players
1974 FIBA World Championship players
Spartak athletes
Basketball players from Saint Petersburg